Judaai, jodayi, or jodai—meaning "separation" in Persian, Hindi, and Urdu—may refer to:

 Judaai (1980 film), an Indian Hindi-language drama film
 Judaai (1997 film), an Indian Hindi-language romantic comedy drama film
 Judaai (TV series), a 2015 Pakistani drama serial
 "Judaai" (song), from the 2015 Bollywood film Badlapur
 A Separation, a 2011 Iranian film

See also
 Tano Jōdai (1886–1982), Japanese academic and peace activist